Provincial elections were held in Vojvodina on 24 April 2016.

Electoral system
The 120 members of the Assembly are elected by proportional representation in a single provincial constituency with a 5% electoral threshold, although the threshold is disregarded for coalitions representing ethnic minorities. Seats are allocated using the d'Hondt method.

Campaign

Electoral lists
1. Serbian Progressive Party, Social Democratic Party of Serbia, Party of United Pensioners of Serbia, Movement of Socialists, Serbian Renewal Movement, New Serbia, Slovaks, Forward (Slovaci napred), Serb Democratic Party

2. Democratic Party, Democratic Alliance of Croats in Vojvodina, New Party

3. Socialist Party of Serbia, United Serbia, Patriotic Movement of Serbia (Patriotski pokret Srbije)

4. League of Social Democrats of Vojvodina

5. Alliance of Vojvodina Hungarians

6. Serbian Radical Party

7. Dveri, Democratic Party of Serbia

8. Liberal Democratic Party, Social Democratic Party

9. Narodni pokret Dinara—Drina—Dunav – Tomislav Bokan

10. Mađarski pokret za autonomiju - Dr Tamaš Korhec - Democratic Fellowship of Vojvodina Hungarians - Áron Csonka

11. Green Party

12. Srpsko ruski pokret – Aleksandar Đurđev

13. Za slobodnu Srbiju – Zavetnici – Milica Đurđević

14. „Vojvođanska tolerancija" (Vojvodina's Party, Montenegrin Party, Sandžačko Raška Partija)

15. Enough is Enough – Saša Radulović

Opinion polls

Results

References

2016
2016 elections in Serbia
21st century in Vojvodina
April 2016 events in Europe